Melanocanthon is a genus of dung beetles in the family Scarabaeidae. There are at least 4 described species in Melanocanthon.

Species
 Melanocanthon bispinatus (Robinson, 1941) (tumble bug)
 Melanocanthon granulifer (Schmidt, 1920)
 Melanocanthon nigricornis (Say, 1823)
 Melanocanthon punctaticollis (Schaeffer, 1915)

References

Further reading

 Arnett, R. H. Jr., M. C. Thomas, P. E. Skelley and J. H. Frank. (eds.). (21 June 2002). American Beetles, Volume II: Polyphaga: Scarabaeoidea through Curculionoidea. CRC Press LLC, Boca Raton, Florida .
 
 Richard E. White. (1983). Peterson Field Guides: Beetles. Houghton Mifflin Company.

Deltochilini